Hans Finsterer (June 24, 1877 in Weng im Innkreis – November 4, 1955 in Vienna) was an Austrian surgeon.

He is known for the Hofmeister-Finsterer operation

References 

Austrian surgeons
1877 births
1955 deaths
People from Braunau am Inn District
20th-century Austrian physicians
20th-century surgeons